The 1999 Munster Senior Hurling Championship Final (sponsored by Guinness) was a hurling match played on Sunday 4 July 2000 at Semple Stadium, Thurles, County Tipperary,. It was contested by Cork and Clare. Cork captained by Mark Landers claimed the title beating Clare on a scoreline of 1-15 to 0-14. 
Joe Deane got the only goal of the game in the first half when a high ball was kept in play on the right by Seánie McGrath for him to flick low past Clare goalkeeper Davy Fitzgerald. Cork had a 1-10 to 0-7 lead at half time. 
The match was shown live in Ireland as part of the Sunday Game live on RTÉ Two.

References

External links
Match Highlights

Munster
Clare county hurling team matches
Cork county hurling team matches
Munster Senior Hurling Championship Finals